Major League Baseball: An Inside Look was a pregame show for NBC's Game of the Week telecasts. It featured one-on-one interviews with the players, and other on-going news and notes relating to Major League Baseball (in particular, the upcoming telecast). The program, which was generally 15 minutes long, ran from 1979-1989 (when NBC lost the rights to broadcast Major League Baseball to CBS). An Inside Look typically took place either on-location at the "A" Game of the Week broadcasting site (such as Yankee Stadium for instance) or simply from NBC's studio in New York City.

Hosts
Marv Albert<ref>[http://docs.newsbank.com/g/GooglePM/SB/lib00167,0EB0D7E7770CEF37.html Oct 6, 1987 - One story NBC won't have is a Marv Albert interview of Cardinals manager Herzog. Herzog will not speak to Albert, host of the pregame show, ""Major League Baseball: An Inside Look. Herzog is still seething about a comment Albert made during a pregame show last season. ...]</ref>Sep 16, 1988 - Marv Albert play by play boxing NBC duties includes host of Major League Baseball An Inside Look the pregame show to the game of the week play by play for regional NFL coverage and play by play for boxing on SportsWorld Also calls the action on radio and television for the NBA's New York ...Jun 23, 1989 - BASEBALL In tomorrow's NBCCh 5Game of the Week the Los Angeles Dodgers take on the Reds in Cincinnati Vin Scully and Tom Seaver call the action beginning at 1 15 pm Marv Albert's Major League Baseball An Inside Look precedes at 1 pm. GYMNASTICS CBS Ch 2 airs taped coverage tomorrow ... 
Len BermanApr 11, 1986 - NBC's pregame showMajor League Baseball An Inside Look debuts with new host Marv Albert  replacing Len Berman grilling commissioner Peter Ueberroth Mary Lou Retton's name has popped up as a leading candidate for an analyst's position during NBC's Summer Olympics coverage from Seoul South ...
Gayle GardnerGoing great guns: Gayle Gardner, in her finest showing at NBC so far, handled the baseball pregame chores well Saturday, including a gut-wrenching interview of Joe Pepitone from New York's Rikers Island jail. NBC also kept the camera focused on Pepitone, without giving us the obligatory shot of the interviewer. 
Bryant GumbelMay 15, 1981 - ... ... DAYS AGAIN t NEWS CONTINUED FROM DAYTIME 6303 SYSTEMS MANAGEMENT6J NBC NEWS8 ABC NEWS P TIC TAC DOUGH 3d2 S3 CBS NEWS CD SANFORD AND SON 659 ... 0 BRADY BUNCH6 MAJOR LEAGUE BASEBALL AN INSIDE LOOK Host Bryant Gumbel Carnation 11 Killer 1973 Norman Eshley Katherlne Schofield No other ... 
Bill Macatee
Ahmad Rashad

See alsoNBA ShowtimeThe NFL on NBC Pregame Show''

References

External links
 

Major League Baseball on NBC
Major League Baseball studio shows
1979 American television series debuts
1970s American television series
1989 American television series endings
1980s American television series